The Politics of Ningxiang in Hunan province in the People's Republic of China is structured in a dual party-government system like all other governing institutions in mainland China. Ningxiang's political system reflects the two major influences on the historical development of China: on the one hand, its legacy as an over 2,000 years feudal system region, and on the other, the powerful influence exerted by China's neighbor to the north, the Soviet Union.

The Mayor of Ningxiang is the highest-ranking official in the People's Government of Ningxiang or Ningxiang Municipal Government. However, in the city's dual party-government governing system, the Mayor has less power than the Communist Party of Ningxiang Municipal Committee Secretary, colloquially termed the "CPC Party Chief of Ningxiang" or "Communist Party Secretary of Ningxiang".

Introduction
As a city of the Communist State, Ningxiang's system of government was based on the Soviet Union system of one party dictatorship. This is referred to as "Soviet Union-style" democracy.

Ningxiang is governed by a democratically elected People's Congress, which corresponds to the parliament of democratic country. The Head of the Ningxiang Municipal Government is the Mayor. The Mayor's agreement is required for an Act of Ningxiang People's Congress to become law. As of 2016, there were 373 Members of Ningxiang People's Congress, who were all elected.

List of CPC Party secretaries of Ningxiang

Republic of China

People's Republic of China

List of mayors of Ningxiang

List of chairmen of Ningxiang People's Congress

List of chairmen of CPPCC Ningxiang Committee

References

External links
 List of leaders of Ningxiang 

Politics
Ningxiang